For the 2013-14 season the Dynamos competed in the NIHL South Division 1.
They had a very strong start to the season, going 13 games unbeaten, including a 7 game win-streak. This spell of early promise included home & away wins over league title-contenders Wightlink Raiders in the Southeast Trophy & ENIHL Southern Cup and an emphatic 6-1 away win against a formidable (and eventual quadruple champions) Chelmsford Chieftains - the Dynamos first win in Chelmsford since December 2009.

Eventually, Invicta succumbed to the combined effects of having a short-bench compared to other teams in the league and injuries, finishing 3rd in the league. Although another period of slight dominance would follow in February, including beating Chelmsford again, this time at home.

Players Iced

Players in bold left the club during the season. Players in bold italic made only a single appearance for the team.

Fixtures and results

Pre-season

NIHL South Division 1

Play-offs

Quarter-final

Semi-final

NIHL Southern Cup

Semi-final

Southeast Trophy

References

External links
Official website

Invicta Dynamos seasons
Inv